Raymond Apple may refer to:

 R. W. Apple Jr. (1934–2006), associate editor of The New York Times
 Raymond Apple (rabbi) (born 1935), Australian orthodox rabbi